The Pyŏlgigun, Byeolgigun, Gyoryeonbyeongdae, or Waepyeolgi (Korean: 별기군, "Special Skills Force" or "Special Army") was the first modernised military force of Korea. First conceived in 1876, it was formed in 1881 and trained by Japanese officers led by Horimoto Reijo, military attaché at the Japanese legation. It received better treatment than the old Korean Army, whose soldiers' salaries were in arrears on account of the costs of the Byeolgigun. This led in 1882 to the Imo mutiny, in which soldiers rioted and Horimoto Reijo was killed.

In May 1881, as part of its plan to modernise the country, the Korean government invited the Japanese military attaché, Lieutenant Horimoto Reizō, to serve as an adviser in creating a modern army. From 80 to 100 young men of the aristocracy were to be given Japanese military training and make up the newly formed Special Skills Force. However, there was resentment towards the formation on the part of the soldiers of the regular army who viewed it with envy as the formation was much better equipped and treated than themselves. Also, more than 1,000 soldiers had been discharged in the process of overhauling the army; most were either old or disabled and the rest had not been given their pay in rice for thirteen months.

References

Bibliography

Further reading
Hyŏn-hŭi Yi, Sŏng-su Pak, Nae-hyŏn Yun. New History of Korea. Jimoondang, 2005.
Shin Hyong Sik; Lee Jean Young, trans. A Brief History of Korea. Ewha Womans University Press, 2005.
Woo Chulgu. "Les guerres sino-japonaise et russo-japonaise" Hérodote 141, 2 (2011): 115–33 .

Military history of Korea
Military units and formations established in 1881
1881 establishments in Korea